Mukhyamantri is a 1996 Bengali political drama film directed by Anjan Choudhury. This film's music was composed by Mrinal Bandhyopadhay.

Plot
Circumstances force Bimal, a righteous headmaster who is well known in his village, to contest the local elections. An envious MLA teams up with the chief minister to plot against him.

Cast
 Ranjit Mallick
 Dulal Lahiri
 Lokesh Ghosh
 Tota Roy Chowdhury
 Chumki Chowdhury
 Ashok Kumar
 Gyanesh Mukherjee
 Debika Mitra
 Rina Choudhury
 Sumanta Mukherjee
 Arun Bandyopadhyay

References

External links
 Mukhyamantri at the Gomolo
 

1996 films
Bengali-language Indian films
1990s Bengali-language films
Films directed by Anjan Choudhury
Indian political drama films